Eugen "Genia" Walaschek (20 June 1917 – 22 March 2007), was a Swiss footballer. He played for Servette Genf and the Switzerland national football team, for whom he appeared in the 1938 FIFA World Cup, scoring a goal in their first-round victory over Nazi Germany. He coached EF La Chaux de Fonds and Urania Genève.

References

1917 births
2007 deaths
Swiss men's footballers
Switzerland international footballers
Servette FC players
BSC Young Boys players
Urania Genève Sport players
1938 FIFA World Cup players
Swiss football managers
Association football forwards
Soviet emigrants to Switzerland
Urania Genève Sport managers